O15 may refer to:
 , a submarine of the Royal Netherlands Navy
 Keystone O-15, a prototype aircraft built for the United States Army Air Corps
 Oxygen-15, an isotope of oxygen
 Turlock Municipal Airport, in Merced County, California, United States
 , a submarine of the United States Navy